Tomb Raider is a 2013 action-adventure video game developed by Crystal Dynamics and published by Square Enix's European branch. It is the tenth main game in the Tomb Raider franchise and a reboot of the series, acting as the first instalment in the Survivor trilogy that reconstructs the origins of Lara Croft. Tomb Raider was released on 5 March 2013 for Microsoft Windows, PlayStation 3 and Xbox 360. Gameplay focus is on survival, with exploration when traversing the island and visiting various optional tombs. It is the first game in the main series to have multiplayer, the first game in the series to be published by Square Enix, after the latter's acquisition of Eidos Interactive in 2009.

Crystal Dynamics began development of Tomb Raider soon after the release of Tomb Raider: Underworld in 2008. Rather than a sequel, the team decided to reboot the series, re-establishing the origins of Lara Croft for the second time, as they did with Tomb Raider: Legend. Tomb Raider is set on Yamatai, an island from which Lara, who is untested and not yet the battle-hardened explorer she is in other titles in the series, must save her friends and escape while being hunted down by a malevolent cult. Camilla Luddington was hired to voice and perform as Lara Croft, replacing Keeley Hawes.

The game suffered a delayed release from late 2012 to March 2013. Upon release, Tomb Raider received critical acclaim, with critics praising the graphics, gameplay, Luddington's performance as Lara, and Lara's characterization and development, although the addition of a multiplayer mode was not well received, and some reviewers directed criticism towards the game's ludonarrative dissonance. Tomb Raider went on to sell more than 14.5 million copies , making it the best-selling Tomb Raider title to date. A remastered version, Tomb Raider: Definitive Edition, was released worldwide in January 2014 for PlayStation 4 and Xbox One containing improved graphics and downloadable content. A sequel, Rise of the Tomb Raider, was released in November 2015 and a third instalment, Shadow of the Tomb Raider, was released in September 2018.

Gameplay 
Tomb Raider is presented in third-person perspective. Players take control of the series lead character Lara Croft. The game uses an interconnected hub-and-spoke model that combines action-adventure, exploration, and survival elements. Players can traverse between the camps and across the island using footpaths, improvised or already-available ziplines and climbable tracks. Many of Lara's moves are carried over from the previous games created by Crystal Dynamics, with some tweaks added, such as incorporating elements of stealth gameplay. Quick time events are scattered at regular intervals throughout the game, often appearing at crucial or fast-moving points in the game's plot, such as extracting a shard of metal, and escaping a collapsing cave.

The combat of the game borrows multiple elements from Naughty Dog's Uncharted series, with players having the ability to free-aim Lara's bow and the guns she salvages, engage in close-quarter combat and perform stealth kills. Players can use Survival Instinct, an ability in which enemies, collectables and objects pivotal to environmental puzzles will be highlighted. The game incorporates role-playing elements: as players progress through the game, they earn experience points from performing certain actions and completing in-game challenges linked with hunting, exploring and combat: this enables players' skills and abilities to be upgraded in specific ways, such as giving her more storage capacity for arrows and ammunition. Players can upgrade and customize weapons using salvaged materials collected across the island. There is a character progression mechanic in the game: better items, weapons and equipment are gained as players progress, though the appearance of most of these items is closely linked to events in the story. In addition to the main story, players can complete multiple side quests, explore the island, revisit locations, and search for challenge tombs.

Multiplayer 
Alongside the single-player mode is an online multiplayer mode, which allows players to compete in several maps. In each multiplayer match, there are two enemy teams: four survivors and four scavengers, and there are three types of games for multiplayer to compete in, played in five different maps: the modes are Team Deathmatch, Private Rescue and Cry for Help. The first mode is a player versus player (PvP) combat scenario, with teams pitted against each other, and the winning team being the one to kill the opposing team in three separate matches. In the second mode, the "survivors" team must take medical supplies to a specific point on the map, while the "scavengers" must reach a certain number of kills, both within a ten-minute time limit. The third mode, "Cry for Help", involves the survivors exploring the maps and retrieving batteries for defended radio beacons while being hunted by the scavengers. Across all three modes, weapons and destroyable environments from the single-player campaign are carried over.

Synopsis

Setting and characters 
The game is set on Yamatai, a fictional lost island in the Dragon's Triangle off the coast of Japan. The island—and the kingdom that once existed there—is shrouded in mystery, given its reputation for fearsome storms and shipwrecks that litter its coastline. Yamatai was once ruled by queen Himiko, known as the "Sun Queen", who, according to legend, was blessed with shamanistic powers that enabled her to control the weather. Very little is known about Yamatai's history in the time since Himiko's death, other than that the island's infamy was established shortly thereafter. In exploring the island, the player may find evidence that—among others—Portuguese traders, United States Marines, and a Japanese military project were all stranded on Yamatai at various points throughout history. At the start of the game, the island is populated by the Solarii Brotherhood, a violent cult of criminals, mercenaries, and shipwreck survivors. The Solarii Brotherhood has established its own society based on the worship of Himiko, complete with a social structure and laws, with their exact purpose and intentions being explored throughout the story.

The player takes on the role of Lara Croft, a young and ambitious archaeology graduate whose theories on the location of the lost kingdom of Yamatai have convinced the Nishimura family—descendants from the people of Yamatai themselves—to fund an expedition in search of the kingdom. The expedition is led by Dr. James Whitman, a celebrity archaeologist who has fallen on hard times and is desperate to avoid bankruptcy, and is accompanied by Conrad Roth, a Royal Marine turned adventurer and close friend of the Croft family who serves as mentor to Lara; Samantha "Sam" Nishimura, Lara's friend and a representative of the Nishimura family who films the expedition for a documentary; Joslyn Reyes, a skeptical and temperamental mechanic and single mother; Jonah Maiava, an imposing and placid fisherman who is willing to believe in the existence of the paranormal and esoteric; Angus "Grim" Grimaldi, the gruff helmsman of the Endurance; and Alex Weiss, a goofy electronics specialist.

Plot 
Lara sets out on her first expedition aboard the ship Endurance, intending to find the lost kingdom of Yamatai. By her suggestion and against Whitman's advice, the expedition ventures into the Dragon's Triangle. The ship is struck by a violent storm and sinks, stranding the survivors on the isolated island. Lara is separated from the others and is forced to escape the cave of a deranged savage. As Lara locates the other survivors, she finds more evidence that the island is inhabited. She finds her friend Sam and a man called Mathias, who claims to be one of the passengers. As Sam tells Mathias the legends of Himiko, Lara passes out; when she wakes, Mathias and Sam are gone. When Lara reunites with the other survivors, Whitman decides to break off from the main party with Lara and search for Roth, who is still missing, while the rest of the group (Reyes, Jonah, Alex, and Grim) look for Sam and Mathias. As Lara and Whitman explore, they discover that the island's inhabitants are worshipping Himiko, confirming that the island is Yamatai. The two are captured by the islanders and taken to a settlement along with other survivors from the Endurance. When the survivors attempt an escape, the captors turn on them. Lara is separated from Whitman and is forced to kill one of her attackers. She locates an injured Roth, and using his equipment, she sets off for a communications relay at the very top of the mountain to contact the outside world and call for aid.

After successfully hailing a plane searching for the Endurance and setting a signal fire for them to follow, Lara witnesses a fierce storm materialize and destroy the plane. Although the pilot successfully parachutes to safety, Lara is powerless to stop the island's inhabitants from killing him. Lara is contacted by Alex and Reyes, who reveal that Sam has been kidnapped by the island's inhabitants, a violent cult known as the Solarii Brotherhood. Lara, who is closest to Sam's position, tries to rescue her but is foiled by Mathias—revealed to be the leader of the Solarii—who orders her killed. Lara is saved by the intervention of a samurai dubbed "Oni" and taken to an ancient monastery in the mountains. Escaping again, Lara stumbles upon a ritual chamber, where she learns that a "fire ritual" was used to choose the Sun Queen's successor as part of a ceremony called the "Ascension". A terrified Sam manages to contact Lara and informs her that the Solarii intends to put her through the fire ritual, which will burn her to death if unsuccessful. Lara fights her way through the Solarii fortress with help from Grim, who is killed after the Solarii captures him. With Roth's help, Lara infiltrates the palace and witnesses Mathias putting Sam through the fire ritual. Lara tries to save Sam, but she is overpowered by Mathias and his men. Sam is not harmed by the flames, which are extinguished by a great wind, marking her as Himiko's rightful successor.

Lara narrowly escapes captivity once again and doubles back to help her friends, whose attempts to reach Sam have resulted in their capture. Aided by Whitman—who managed to negotiate some degree of freedom with the Solarii—Lara returns to the palace to rescue Sam as Roth commandeers a helicopter to get them out. Having witnessed the storm that forced the search plane to crash, Lara sends Sam to escape by land and tries to force the pilot to land as a second storm brews up, striking the helicopter and forcing them to crash. Lara nearly dies, and Roth is fatally wounded by Mathias while saving her. Lara realizes that the storms are being magically generated to keep everyone trapped on the island. She meets up with the other survivors, who have evaded the Solarii long enough to secure a boat that can be repaired and used to escape. They are joined by Whitman, who claims to have escaped, though Lara suspects him of working with the cultists. Lara heads for the wreck of the Endurance to meet up with Alex, who had previously gone there to salvage the tools needed to repair the boat. She finds him trapped under the wreckage, but Alex forces her to flee from Solarii cultists and sacrifices himself so Lara can escape with the tools.

Following the lead of a World War II-era Japanese military expedition researching the storms, Lara explores an ancient coastal tomb. She discovers the remains of the general of the Stormguard—the Oni defending the monastery—who had committed seppuku; in his final message, he reveals that Himiko's successor took her own life rather than receive her power, leaving Himiko's soul trapped in her body after death. Lara realizes that the "Ascension" is a ritual that transfers Himiko's soul into a new body, destroying the host's soul in the process. Himiko's spirit wants to escape its current body, and Mathias plans to offer Sam as a new host. Lara returns to the survivors to find that Whitman has betrayed them, abducting Sam and giving her to Mathias. Lara, Jonah, and Reyes give chase to the monastery, with Lara arriving just in time to see Whitman killed by the Oni. After fighting her way through the queen's guards, Lara arrives at the top of the monastery in time to see Mathias start the Ascension ritual. She works her way to Mathias, confronting Solarii and guards alike. Lara kills Mathias when she shoots him from the roof of the monastery using her signature dual-wield style, before destroying Himiko's remains to save Sam. With the storms dispersed, Lara, Sam, Reyes, and Jonah leave the island and are picked up by a cargo ship. As she and her friends sail home, Lara decides that there are many more myths to be found and resolves to uncover them, stating that she is not returning home just yet.

Development 
Following Tomb Raider: Underworld, Crystal Dynamics was split into two teams; one beginning work on the next sequential pillar of the Tomb Raider franchise, the other focusing on the newly created spin-off Lara Croft series (debuting with Lara Croft and the Guardian of Light in 2010). Following pre-announcement media hype while the game's title was under embargo, in November 2010, Square Enix filed for trademark of the slogan for the new Tomb Raider game; "A Survivor is Born". Square Enix revealed in December that Tomb Raider was in production for nearly 2 years. Studio head Darrell Gallagher said that the new title is unlike anything what was before, describing it as an origin story of Lara Croft and her journey on a new way.

In January 2012, when asked if the game would be available on Nintendo's Wii U console, Crystal Dynamics global brand director Karl Stewart responded that there were no plans to have the game available on that platform. According to Stewart, the reason for this was that "it would not be right" for the game to simply be ported, as the developers built the game to be platform-specific before the Wii U was announced, and also mentioned that if they started building the game for the platform, the team would have build it very differently and with unique functionality. The multiplayer mode was created by Canadian video game development studio Eidos-Montréal, known for making Deus Ex: Human Revolution. That May, the game was delayed and was scheduled for the first quarter of 2013. Darrell Gallagher said that they wanted to create a new things for this title and was the reason for delay. The Definitive Edition framerate is unlocked on PlayStation 4, varying from 32 to 60fps (averaging 53.36fps). The Xbox One version is locked to 30fps (averaging 29.98fps); both versions of the game have a resolution of 1080p.

Animated model 
Lara Croft's model is animated using compiled performance capture, a technique used in the previous installment Tomb Raider: Underworld. The game was built on Crystal Dynamics' game engine called "Foundation". Lara's face is based on that of model Megan Farquhar. "Turning Point" CGI teaser trailer premiered at the E3 held in June 2011, emphasizing the release date was to be in the third quarter of 2012. The trailer was produced by Square Enix's CGI studio Visual Works.

Voice cast 
Keeley Hawes did not return as Lara Croft for 2013's Tomb Raider, after working on Tomb Raider: Legend, Anniversary, Underworld and Lara Croft and the Guardian of Light. She reprised the role of Lara in the downloadable game Lara Croft and the Temple of Osiris, which was released in December 2014. Crystal Dynamics was said to be auditioning dozens of voice actresses. The voice actress of Lara Croft was revealed to be Camilla Luddington in June 2012. Lara is played by Nadine Njeim in the Arabic dub, by Nora Tschirner in the German dub, by Alice David in the French dub, by Karolina Gorczyca in the Polish dub, by Yuko Kaida in the Japanese dub, by Benedetta Ponticelli in the Italian dub, by Guiomar Alburquerque Durán in the Spanish dub and by Polina Sherbakova in the Russian dub.

Gameplay showcases 
The gameplay trailer was released online in May 2012, showcasing more action-based gameplay along with varying plot elements. The trailer confirmed the presence of several other non-playable characters besides Lara on the island, many of which appear to be part of a menacing organization. On 4 June, at Microsoft's E3 2012 press conference, a new gameplay demonstration was shown, depicting environmental destruction and other interactivity, stealth combat using a bow and arrow, quick-time events and parachuting. During the summer, gameplay was shown of Lara hunting, exploring the island and killing for the first time. They were shown at Eurogamer Expo at London on 27 September. On 8 December, a new trailer was shown during Spike Video Game Awards. At the beginning, an introduction was made by Camilla Luddington and during the event, the trailer was followed by a musical orchestra, led by music composer Jason Graves. The next week, IGN presented: Tomb Raider Week. Each day from Monday to Friday, previews, features and trailers were released, showing more details for the upgrading system, survival tools and challenge tombs. Tomb Raider went gold on 8 February 2013.

Music 

Tomb Raiders soundtrack was composed by Jason Graves, whose previous work includes Dead Space and its sequels, F.E.A.R. 3 and Star Trek: Legacy. The Tomb Raider: Original Soundtrack was released on 5 March 2013, alongside the game's worldwide release. The album was released to critical acclaim, with multiple sites including Forbes and the magazine Film Score Monthly giving it high praise.

A podcast was released by Game Informer in December 2010, featuring a "sneak peek at a track from the game itself" composed by Aleksandar Dimitrijevic. Crystal Dynamics global brand director, Karl Stewart, clarified Game Informer's statement, confirming that Alex Dimitrijevic was hired to score the trailer, but they did not find the official composer for the game. After the trailer's première in June 2011, Stewart stated in regard to the final Turning Point score that "...this piece is not a piece that [Alex Dimitrijevic]'s worked on". Meagan Marie, community manager at Crystal Dynamics, expressed on the Tomb Raider blog that their goal was to release a soundtrack. Stewart added that "this is a completely new composer and somebody who we've brought in to work on the game as well as this [trailer] piece" and that "we're going to make a bigger announcement later in the year".

In the Making of Turning Point, sound designer Alex Wilmer explained that the unannounced composer had remotely directed an in-house concert violinist to perform the "very intimate" piece. In the fourth Crystal Habit podcast which premiered at the Tomb Raider blog in October 2011, Marie spoke to Wilmer and lead sound designer Jack Grillo about their collaboration with the unannounced composer. Grillo stated that "we're doing this overture... where we're taking an outline of the narrative structure and having our composer create different themes and textures that would span the entire game" while Wilmer emphasised that the composer's music will dynamically adapt in-game; scored "...emotionally so that it reacts instantly to what happens".

In an episode of The Final Hours of Tomb Raider on YouTube, the composer was revealed as Jason Graves. Apart from his trademark orchestral style, Graves wished to create a signature sound that would impress on players and stand out when heard. Along with using objects like mallets to create odd musical sounds, Graves, with the help of neighbouring architect Matt McConnell, created a special percussion instrument that would create a variety of odd signature sounds to mix in with the rest of the orchestral score. Although the location was set in the locale of Japan, Graves did not want Japanese instrumentation: instead, he chose sounds and themes that would be indicative of the scavengers on the island, who came from multiple regions of the globe. Using different percussion instruments in different ways, he was able to create the feeling of "founds sounds".

Release 

Tomb Raider was released as scheduled on 5 March 2013 for PlayStation 3, Xbox 360 and Microsoft Windows, but was released earlier in Australia on 1 March. On 25 April, Tomb Raider was released in Japan. A ported version of the game to the Mac OS X was released by Feral Interactive on 23 January 2014. Tomb Raider: Definitive Edition, an updated version, was released worldwide in January 2014 for PlayStation 4 and Xbox One containing all features and downloadable content. Unlike the previous installments that received a T rating, Tomb Raider is the first game in the series to receive an M rating by the ESRB, due to blood and gore, intense violence and strong language.

Pre-release incentives 
Prior to the game's release, various stores offered extra items as a way of attracting customers to order the game from their store. In North America, GameStop offered the in-game Challenge Tomb. Best Buy orders received the Tomb Raider: The Beginning, a 48-page hardcover graphic novel, written by the game's lead writer Rhianna Pratchett, and telling the story of "how the ill-fated voyage of the Endurance came to be". These orders also came with the Aviatrix Skin as well as the Shanty Town multiplayer map. Walmart orders received a free digital download of Lara Croft and the Guardian of Light, access to a real-life scavenger hunt, the Shanty Town multiplayer map and an exclusive Guerrilla Skin outfit. Pre-orders from Microsoft Store received 1600 Microsoft Points for Xbox Live.

Customers ordering from Amazon received access to the Tomb Raider: The Final Hours Edition, including with a 32-page art book, an in-game Hunter Skin for Lara, and a digital copy of Geoff Keighley's The Final Hours of Tomb Raider for the Kindle Fire. Customers received the Shanty Town multiplayer map and an access code to a real-life scavenger hunt. Customers who purchased from Steam received a free copy of Lara Croft and the Guardian of the Light, a Challenge Tomb entitled Tomb of the Lost Adventurer and the Shanty Town multiplayer map. Steam offered three exclusive bonus Team Fortress 2 items.

In the United Kingdom, ShopTo.net offered a digitised graphic novel, entitled Tomb Raider: The Beginning. Orders from Amazon.co.uk received the Shanty Town multiplayer map.

Retail editions 
Exclusive for Europe is the Survival Edition. This edition comes with a mini art book, double sided map of the in-game island, CD soundtrack, an exclusive weapons pack, and a survival pouch. The Collector's Edition for Europe contains everything from the Survival Edition along with an 8" Play Arts Kai Lara Croft figurine in a metal box. The Collector's Edition for North America is similar to the European one, but instead of a mini art book and a survival pouch it contains three iron-on badges and a lithograph. A new version of the game including re-built graphics and all downloadable content, titled Definitive Edition, was released on PlayStation 4 and Xbox One in January 2014.

The Survival Edition from Steam includes a digital 32-page art book, 10 downloadable tracks from the Tomb Raider soundtrack, a digital double sided map of the game's island, a digital comic, the Guerilla Skin outfit and three in-game weapons from Hitman: Absolution.

In the United Kingdom, Game offered the exclusive Explorer Edition bundle, which included an exploration themed Challenge Tomb and a skill upgrade. Exclusive to Tesco was the Combat Strike Pack, which included three weaponry upgrades and a skill upgrade.

A limited edition wireless controller for the Xbox 360 was released on 5 March 2013. A download code for an Xbox exclusive playable Tomb Raider multiplayer character was included.

Downloadable content 
At E3 2012, during Microsoft's press conference, Crystal Dynamics' Darrell Gallagher unveiled that Xbox 360 users would get early access to downloadable content (DLC). In March 2013, Xbox Live users had early access to the "Caves & Cliffs" map pack. The map pack consisted of three new Tomb Raider multiplayer maps, entitled "Scavenger Caverns", "Cliff Shantytown" and "Burning Village". The pack later became available for PSN and Steam users in April. The "1939" multiplayer map pack was released for Xbox 360, PS3 and PC, consisting of two new multiplayer maps, entitled "Dogfight" and "Forest Meadow". Later in April, Square Enix released a Japanese Language Pack on Steam. A multiplayer DLC pack was released on 7 May, entitled "Shipwrecked", on Xbox Live, PSN and Steam, offering two additional multiplayer maps, "Lost Fleet" and "Himiko's Cradle". Additionally, a single player outfit pack was released on Xbox Live. The pack contained the Demolition, Sure-Shot and Mountaineer outfits.

Reception 

Tomb Raider received critical acclaim upon release. GamesMaster magazine gave the game a score of 90%, as well as the "GamesMaster Gold award" (awarded to games that manage a score of 90% or above). The editor regarded the quality of the visuals, the length and depth of the gameplay, and the "spectacular" last third of the game as the highlights. IGN's Keza MacDonald spoke extremely positively, stating that they felt the game was "exciting" and "beautifully presented", included "great characterization" and more depth. They gave the game an overall score of 9.1 out of 10, the highest score they have given a game in the series since 1996's Tomb Raider, describing it as "amazing" and concluding that the game "did justice" to both the character and franchise. Ryan Taljonick of GamesRadar lauded the location's setting and environment, and expressed that the areas never feel like a rehash of another. Taljonick also felt that the game had great pacing, and was unrivaled by any other game in the genre. Furthermore, the reviewer considered Lara's character development as "an integral part" of the whole game's experience, and concluded that Tomb Raider "is a fantastic game and an excellent origin story for one of gaming's original treasure seekers". Australian TV show Good Game praised the game: it was rated 10/10 by both hosts, becoming the eighth game in the show's seven-year run to do so. Giant Bomb gave the game four stars out of five, only having a minor issues with the game's tone at conflict with its action.

One of the major criticisms of the game stemmed from a disparity between the emotional thrust of the story and the actions of the player, with GameTrailers' Justin Speer pointing out that while the story attempted to characterise Lara Croft as vulnerable and uncomfortable with killing, the player was encouraged to engage enemies aggressively and use brutal tactics to earn more experience points. Speer felt that this paradoxical approach ultimately let the game down as it undermined Lara's character to the point where he found it difficult to identify with her at all. IGN's Keza MacDonald highlighted the same, but was less critical of it than Speer, pointing out that both Lara and the player had to adapt quickly to killing in order to survive. However, Game Informers Matt Miller noted that the game offered the player several options for progressing through its combat situations, and that the player could avoid open conflict entirely if they chose to do so. He praised the behaviour and presence of the enemies for the way they felt like they had actual tasks to perform on the island, rather than being clusters of polygons whose only function was to be killed by the player in order for them to progress. While on the subject of character development, GamesRadar's Ryan Taljonick expressed that the supporting characters were underdeveloped relative to Lara Croft, describing them as generic and, while rarely annoying, not memorable.

While many reviews applauded the single-player campaign, the multiplayer mode bore the brunt of the game's criticism, with MacDonald, Speer and Miller all finding fault with it, describing it as lackluster and stating that the difference between the developer's vision for the game mode and the finished product made it difficult to enjoy.

Tomb Raider: Definitive Edition received positive reviews. Game Informers Matt Helgeson considered the updated graphics at native 1080p resolution as a good addition to the core Tomb Raider experience. He cited some differences in graphics between the two versions and noted a bit smoother frame-rate on the PlayStation 4 version. The Escapist's Jim Sterling was less receptive to the Definitive Edition; they praised the visual improvements, but felt that nominal content additions to the single-player experience and the game's price point made it difficult to recommend to players outside of those who had not played the original version. GameZone Matt Liebl gave Tomb Raider: Definitive Edition a 9/10 and recommended for the players who never played the original version.

Prior to the game's release, news of an attempted rape plot element drew ire and led to multiple op-ed pieces. A developer interview described an early cutscene as an attempted "rape" that proves formative in Croft's genesis story, but the developer later reiterated that sexual assault was not a theme of the game and that the executive producer had misspoken. Sexual assault and women had already been a volatile topic in games journalism. Tomb Raider lead writer later reflected that the controversy was the result of misinformation.

Sales 
The game sold more than 1 million copies less than 48 hours after its release. In the United Kingdom, Tomb Raider debuted at number one on the charts, and became the biggest UK title launch in 2013, surpassing the sales of Aliens: Colonial Marines, before being overtaken by Grand Theft Auto V. Tomb Raider set a new record for the franchise, more than doubling the debut sales of Tomb Raider: Legend. Furthermore, the Xbox 360 and PlayStation 3 versions of Tomb Raider set new week one records as the fastest-selling individual formats of any Tomb Raider title so far, a record which was previously held by Tomb Raider: The Angel of Darkness. Tomb Raider topped the charts in France, Ireland, Italy, the Netherlands, Norway, and the United States. In the United States, Tomb Raider was the second best-selling title of March, excluding download sales, behind BioShock Infinite. In Japan, Tomb Raider debuted at number four with 35,250 units sold.

Three weeks after its release on March 26, Square Enix announced that the game sold 3.4 million copies worldwide at retail, but has failed to reach predicted sales targets. Crystal Dynamics however defended Tomb Raiders sales, stating the reboot had the "most successful launch" of any game that year in addition to setting a new record for highest sales in the franchise's history. On 22 August, Darrell Gallagher, head of product development and studios for Square Enix, said to Gamasutra that the game had sold more than 4 million copies worldwide. In the United Kingdom, Tomb Raider was the 6th best-selling boxed game of 2013. In January 2014, Scot Amos, executive producer of Tomb Raider, revealed that at the end of 2013 the game achieved profitability. On 3 February, Tomb Raider: Definitive Edition, a re-release for PlayStation 4 and Xbox One, debuted atop the UK charts. Gallagher predicted on March 6 that the game would surpass 6 million units by the end of the month. By April 2015, Gallagher announced that the sales had reached 8.5 million, making the game the best-selling Tomb Raider title to date. , the game has sold more than 14.5 million copies.

Awards

Sequel 

Comic book writer Gail Simone was hired in 2013 to continue the reboot's story in a line of comics published by Dark Horse Comics; the story of the comic leads directly into a sequel. Later, at the beginning of August, Square Enix's Western CEO Phil Rogers confirmed that a sequel to Tomb Raider was being developed for unspecified next-gen consoles. In an interview later that year, Brian Horton, the senior art director for Crystal Dynamics, said that the sequel would tell the next chapter of Lara's development.

During Microsoft's E3 2014 presentation, Rise of the Tomb Raider was announced as a sequel, initially exclusive to Xbox consoles at launch. The exclusivity was timed, which meant that the title would see a release on other platforms after an unspecified period of time. Microsoft published the title for its release on Xbox consoles. Rise of the Tomb Raider was released on 10 November 2015 for Xbox One and Xbox 360, and 28 January 2016 for Microsoft Windows. The PlayStation 4 version was released on 11 October 2016, titled the 20 Year Celebration, as it was released 20 years after the original Tomb Raider game. This version includes all of the previously released downloadable content.

Film adaptation 

The 2018 Tomb Raider reboot film adaptation, directed by Roar Uthaug, is in part based on the video game. Alicia Vikander, who portrays Lara Croft, was cast alongside actors Daniel Wu and Walton Goggins. The story follows Lara Croft's search for her father. The film was released on 16 March 2018.

References 
Notes

Footnotes

External links 
 
 

2013 video games
Action-adventure games
Asymmetrical multiplayer video games
Crystal Dynamics games
Feral Interactive games
Hunting in video games
Linux games
MacOS games
Multiplayer and single-player video games
PlayStation 3 games
PlayStation 4 games
Square Enix games
Stadia games
Stealth video games
Survival video games
Tomb Raider games
Video games about cults
Video game reboots
Video games based on Japanese mythology
Video games developed in Canada
Video games developed in the Netherlands
Video games developed in the United States
Video games featuring female protagonists
Video games scored by Jason Graves
Video games set in Japan
Video games set on fictional islands
Video games with downloadable content
Windows games
Xbox 360 games
Xbox One games
Video games developed in the United Kingdom
Nixxes Software games